A trilogy is a set of three distinct works that are connected and can be seen either as a single work or as three individual works. They are commonly found in literature, film, and video games. Three-part works that are considered components of a larger work also exist, such as the triptych or the three-movement sonata, but they are not commonly referred to with the term "trilogy".

Most trilogies are works of fiction involving the same characters or setting, such as The Deptford Trilogy of novels by Robertson Davies, The Apu Trilogy of films by Satyajit Ray, The Kingdom Trilogy of television miniseries from 1994 to 2022 by Lars von Trier. Other fiction trilogies are connected only by theme: for example, each film of Krzysztof Kieślowski's Three Colours trilogy explores one of the political ideals of the French Republic (liberty, equality, fraternity). Trilogies can also be connected in less obvious ways, such as The Nova Trilogy of novels by William S. Burroughs, each written using cut-up technique.

The term is seldom applied outside media. One example is the "Marshall Trilogy", a common term for three rulings written by U.S. Supreme Court Chief Justice John Marshall from 1823 to 1832 concerning the legal status of Native Americans under U.S. law.

Trilogies—and series in general—are common in speculative fiction.

History
Trilogies ( trilogia)   date back to ancient times. In the Dionysia festivals of ancient Greece, for example, trilogies of plays were performed followed by a fourth satyr play. The Oresteia is the only surviving trilogy of these ancient Greek plays, originally performed at the festival in Athens in 458 BC. The three Theban plays, or Oedipus cycle, by Sophocles, originating in 5th century BC, is not a true example of a trilogy because the plays were written at separate times and with different themes/purposes.

An example of a modern trilogy in popular fiction would be J. R. R. Tolkien's The Lord of the Rings (1954-1955), which was published in three parts for economic reasons (although it was written as a single novel). In addition, technical changes in printing and film in the mid-to-late 20th century made the creation of trilogies more feasible, while the development of mass media and modern global distribution networks has made them more likely to be lucrative. Other examples of trilogies in fiction include the Wayfarers trilogy by Knut Hamsun, the Cairo Trilogy by Naguib Mahfouz, The Border Trilogy by Cormac McCarthy, or His Dark Materials by Philip Pullman.

In media

Films 

 Lars von Trier has occasionally referred to his films as falling into thematic and stylistic trilogies; about the apocalyptic subject matters in Europa trilogy (consists The Element of Crime (1984), Epidemic (1987), and Europa (1991)); the heroine's tragedies in Golden Heart trilogy (consists Breaking the Waves (1996), The Idiots (1998), and Dancer in the Dark (2000)); the anti-American culture in Land of Opportunities trilogy (consists Dogville (2003) and Manderlay (2005)); and the artistic imagery portrays graphic sexuality and disturbing violence in Depression trilogy (consists of Antichrist (2009), Melancholia (2011), and Nymphomaniac (2013)).
 The Before trilogy consists of three American romance films created by Richard Linklater and starring Ethan Hawke and Julie Delpy, who both co-wrote the two sequels. Beginning with Before Sunrise (1995), and continuing with Before Sunset (2004) and Before Midnight (2013).
 The Death trilogy consists of three psychological drama films about the human condition and intertwined plots with different characters; Amores perros (2000), 21 Grams (2003) and Babel (2006); all directed by Alejandro González Iñárritu and written by Guillermo Arriaga.
 Gay Galician Dogma consists of three Dogme 95 films about life, love, and sex; Once Upon Another Time (2000; Dogme #22), Wedding Days (2002; Dogme #30), and The Outcome (2005; Dogme #31); all directed by Spanish filmmaker Juan Pinzás.

Music 
The term is less often applied to music. One example is the Berlin Trilogy of David Bowie, which is linked together by musical sound and lyrical themes, all having been recorded at least partly in Berlin, Germany. Another example can be found in the Guns N' Roses songs "November Rain", "Don't Cry" and "Estranged", whose videos are considered a trilogy.

Video games 

 N. Sane Trilogy was released between 1996 to 1999, consists Crash Bandicoot (1996), Cortex Strikes Back (1997), and Warped (1998); which were originally developed by Naughty Dog for the PlayStation. This resulted to remaster into a collection titled Crash Bandicoot N. Sane Trilogy, but not affiliated with Naughty Dog.
 The Lisa Trilogy was released between 2012 and 2015, developed by Dingaling Productions, with each three games (consists The First, The Painful, and The Joyful) have different apocalyptic settings and playable protagonists, and themes of transgenerational trauma and child abuse.

Adding works to an existing trilogy
Creators of trilogies may later add more works. In such a case, the original three works may or may not keep the title "trilogy".

 The first three novels in The Hitchhiker's Guide to the Galaxy series were dubbed a trilogy, and even after he extended the series, author Douglas Adams continued to use the term for humorous effect - for example, calling Mostly Harmless "the fifth book in the increasingly inaccurately named trilogy."
 Kevin Smith's films Clerks, Mallrats and Chasing Amy were often marketed as "The New Jersey Trilogy" because they had overlapping characters, events and locations. After the release of a fourth film, Dogma, the series is referred to as "the View Askewniverse".
 The Star Wars trilogy of three films released between 1977 and 1983 has since been expanded into a trilogy of trilogies: the original trilogy, the prequel trilogy released between 1999 and 2005, and the sequel trilogy released between 2015 and 2019.

See also

 List of feature film series with three entries
 Trifecta
 Tritheism
 Tetralogy

References

 
Narrative forms
 
Literary series
Film series
Video game franchises